Still the One: Live from Vegas is the first live album by Canadian singer Shania Twain. It was released on March 3, 2015 by Mercury Nashville.

Album information
Still the One: Live from Vegas features nineteen live tracks from Twain's successful Las Vegas show, called Shania: Still the One. It was released simultaneously with a DVD of the show.

Track listing

Charts
The album debuted on the Top Country Albums chart at No. 31 before its official release with 1,300 copies sold, and rose to No. 2 the next week with 9,400 copies sold on its official release. It also debuted at No. 58 on the Billboard 200 the same week, and peaked at No. 55 the following week.  It has sold 23,100 copies in the US as of March 2015.

Weekly charts

Year-end charts

DVD

Release history

References

2015 live albums
Shania Twain albums
Mercury Records live albums
Albums recorded at Caesars Palace